Epsilon Cancri (ε Cancri, abbreviated Epsilon Cnc, ε Cnc) is a white-hued binary star system in the zodiac constellation of Cancer. It is the brightest member of the Beehive Cluster with an apparent visual magnitude of +6.29, which is near the lower limit of visibility with the naked eye.

The binary pair has the designation WDS J08405+1933.  The primary star is designated Epsilon Cancri and the secondary is HD 73711. Epsilon Cancri is itself a spectroscopic binary with components designated Aa (also named Meleph) and Ab.  HD 73711 is also suspected of being a spectroscopic binary.

Nomenclature 

ε Cancri (Latinised to Epsilon Cancri) is the system's Bayer designation, which originally referred to the entire cluster.

In 2016, the IAU organized a Working Group on Star Names (WGSN) to catalog and standardize proper names for stars. The WGSN decided to attribute proper names to individual stars rather than entire multiple systems. It approved the name Meleph for the component Epsilon Cancri Aa on 5 September 2017 and it is now so included in the List of IAU-approved Star Names.

Properties 

The system is moving away from the Sun with a radial velocity of +30 km/s.

Epsilon Cancri A is a double-lined spectroscopic binary system with an orbital period of 35.14 days and eccentricity of 0.42. It has a stellar classification of A5 III, which matches an A-type giant star. The spectrum displays the chemically peculiar characteristics of an Am star. Its spectral type has been listed as kA3hA5mF0, indicating the different spectral types shown by spectral lines of calcium, hydrogen, and other metals.  Despite the spectral classification, evolutionary models suggest that the star is still on the main sequence, although at the very end of its hydrogen-burning life.  The age of the system is estimated to be around 637 million years.

HD 73711 is another Am star, given a stellar classification of F0 III on the basis of its hydrogen absorption lines but a more complete classification of kA3hA5mF0.  Although the spectral class would indicate that the star is a giant, models suggest that it is still fusing hydrogen in its core.

References 

A-type giants
Cancer (constellation)
Cancri, Epsilon
Cancri, 41
BD+20 2171
073731
042556
3429
Am stars